Tiptoe (also tiptoes or tippy toes) is the body posture of standing on one's toes.

Tiptoe, tiptoes, or tippy toes may refer to:

Arts and entertainment

Music
"Tiptoe" (song) by Imagine Dragons, 2012
Tip Toe (Jason Derulo song), 2017
Tip Toe (Roddy Ricch song), 2019
"Tiptoe", a 2003 song by Goldfrapp from Black Cherry
"Tiptoe", a 2001 song by Joy and the Boy from Paradise
"Tippy Toe", a 2004 song by Utada from Exodus

Film and stage
Tip-Toes, a 1925 musical by the Gershwins and others
Tip Toes, a 1927 British silent film comedy-drama starring Dorothy Gish and Will Rogers
Tiptoes, a 2003 film featuring Matthew McConaughey, Kate Beckinsale, Patricia Arquette, and Gary Oldman

Places 
Tip Toe Falls (or Tiptoe Falls), a small waterfall in Portola Redwoods State Park, California, USA 
Tiptoe, Hampshire, a village in the New Forest National Park, Hampshire, England

Other uses 
Tippy Toe (character), in Marvel Comics
, a British Royal Navy submarine launched in 1944

See also
Toe walking, a condition or ailment where a person walks on his or her toes
En pointe,  meaning "on the tips of the toes" in classical ballet
Digitigrade, an animal that naturally stands or walks on its toes (or digits)
The Tale of Timmy Tiptoes, a children's book by Beatrix Potter